The 2015 Tahiti Championship competition was the 42nd season of the Tahitian domestic rugby union club competition operated by the Fédération Polynésienne de Rugby (FPR).

References

Tahiti
Rugby union in Tahiti
Tahiti